Indian dog may refer to:

 Indian pariah dog, the native landrace dog in India.
 Dhole of India, also known as the Indian Wild Dog, Cuon alpinus
 Hare Indian dog, an extinct dog breed originally kept by the Hare Indians of Canada
 Carolina Dog of the Southeast United States
 Native American dogs, a number of now-extinct breeds once kept as pets by American Indians
 Rez dogs, wild dogs on Indian reservations in the United States